Jimmy Katoa (born 26 April 1980) in the Cook Islands is a footballer who plays as a defender. He currently plays for Avatiu in the Cook Islands Round Cup and the Cook Islands national football team.

References

1965 births
Living people
Cook Islands international footballers
Association football defenders
Cook Island footballers
1998 OFC Nations Cup players
Women's national association football team managers